St John's Archcathedral is a Roman Catholic church within the Old Town precinct in Warsaw, Poland. St John's is one of three major cathedrals in the city, but it is the only temple that also possesses the title of an archcathedral. It is the mother church of the Archdiocese of Warsaw and one of Poland's national pantheons. Along with the old city, the church has been listed by UNESCO as a World Heritage Site.

History 

Originally built in the 14th century in Masovian Gothic style, the cathedral served as a coronation and burial site for numerous Dukes of Masovia.

The archcathedral was connected with the Royal Castle (Zamek Królewski w Warszawie) by an elevated 80-meter-long corridor that had been built by Queen Anna Jagiellonka in the late 16th century and extended in the 1620s after Michał Piekarski's failed 1620 attempt to assassinate King of Poland Sigismund III in front of the cathedral.

After the resolution of the Constitution of May 3, 1791, at the end of the session at the Royal Castle, King Stanisław August Poniatowski went to the Cathedral of St John to repeat the Oath of the Constitution in front of the Altar, in the face of God. Also the Marshals of the Great Sejm were carried to the archcathedral on the shoulders of the enthusiastic deputies of the Sejm.

The church was rebuilt several times, most notably in the 19th century, it was preserved until World War II as an example of English Gothic Revival.

In 1944, during the Warsaw Uprising (August–October 1944), the cathedral was a place of struggle between insurgents and advancing German army. The Germans managed to induct a tank loaded with explosives into the cathedral, a huge explosion destroyed large part of the building. After the collapse of the Uprising, German Vernichtungskommando (Destruction Detachment) drilled holes into the walls for explosives and blew up the cathedral destroying 90% of its walls.

The cathedral was rebuilt after the war. The exterior reconstruction is based on the 14th-century church's presumed appearance (according to an early-17th-century Hogenberg illustration and a 1627 Abraham Boot drawing), not on its prewar appearance.

Interior 

The profuse Early Baroque decoration inside from the beginning of the 17th century and magnificent painting on the main altar by Palma il Giovane depicting Virgin and Child with St. John the Baptist and St. Stanisław were destroyed in German bombing of the church on August 17, 1944. The remains of the church were blown up by the Germans in November 1944. One wall that somehow managed to survive was all that was left of the six-hundred-year-old edifice. This devastation of a Polish national monument was a part of the Planned destruction of Warsaw, which had officially begun after the collapse of the Warsaw Uprising.

The painting of the Virgin and Child was created in 1618 for King Sigismund III Vasa especially to place on the central altar of the St John's Cathedral. As a masterpiece it was confiscated on Napoleon's order and transported to Paris. It was retrieved by Warsaw authorities in 1820s after the Congress of Vienna. It survived many wars and the bombing of Warsaw since it was painted, but did not survive World War II. Among the sculptures lost due to German bombardment, the most worthy of mentioning was a marble bust of Jan Franciszek Bieliński, voivode of Malbork (died 1685), carved by Jean-Joseph Vinache.

The interior reconstruction design considerably differed from the pre-war cathedral, taking it back in time to its raw Gothic look, because very little of the cathedral's original furnishings has been preserved. The cathedral is a three-nave building, two aisles are the same height as the main nave. On the right side from the front a belfry is situated, a passage to Dziekania Street is situated underneath it. There is a pulpit from 1959, designed by Józef Trenarowski and stalls which are a replica of the destroyed baroque ones, founded by King John III Sobieski. Moreover, there are many chapels, gravestones and epitaphs in the cathedral. By the left aisle are numerous chapels. They are, in turn, from the main altar:

 Baryczka Chapel, at the end of the left aisle (it contains a wooden crucifix, regarded as the most precious element of the cathedral's furnishings; it was brought from Nuremberg in 1539 by the merchant Jerzy Baryczka), 
 The Chapel of Whipped Christ (the oldest chapel, it dates back to 15th century)
 The Baptistery (with a valuable baptismal, which dates back to 1631)
 The Chapel of John the Baptist
 Saint Stanisław Chapel, from 15th century
 Among the reconstructed elements of the original interior is the rococo altar in the Chapel of the Immaculate Conception, the so-called Literary Chapel, with an effigy of the Virgin Mary from the destroyed St Andrew's Church at the Theatre Square, dating back to the 17th century.

The painting that once belonged to the Polish kings John II Casimir Vasa, Michael Korybut Wiśniowiecki and John III Sobieski, was used during the battles.

Burials 

The crypts beneath the main aisle hold the remains of notable persons, including:
 Dukes of Masovia:
 Stanisław
 Janusz III
 King Stanisław August Poniatowski, the last Polish monarch
 Adam Kazanowski
 composers and musicians of the Royal Cappella Vasa, e.g. Asprillo Pacelli, whose magnificent black-marble epitaph with composer's bust was reconstructed after the war
 statesman Stanisław Małachowski, whose white-marble monument was designed by Bertel Thorvaldsen (destroyed, August 21, 1944, when a German tank filled with explosives struck the cathedral's southern wall; reconstructed, 1965)
 painter Marcello Bacciarelli
 writer Henryk Sienkiewicz
 presidents of Poland:
 Gabriel Narutowicz
 Ignacy Mościcki
 prime minister and composer Ignacy Jan Paderewski
 General Kazimierz Sosnkowski
 primates:
 August Hlond
 Józef Glemp
 Stefan Wyszyński

Gallery

Historic images

Sculptures

See also
 Royal coronations in St John's Cathedral
 Polish Crown Jewels
 Gniezno Cathedral

References

External links 

  sztuka.net Pictures of the church.
  www.warszawa1939.pl In the prewar Warsaw.
  Archidiecezja Warszawska Some newest pictures.
  sztuka.net, Mausoleum of the Dukes of Masovia

 Sacred Restorations: Polish Cathedrals Built Anew

John's Cathedral
Roman Catholic cathedrals in Poland
Basilica churches in Poland
14th-century Roman Catholic church buildings in Poland
20th-century Roman Catholic church buildings in Poland
Gothic architecture in Poland
Burial sites of the Piast dynasty
Rebuilt buildings and structures in Poland